The 1997 UCI Road World Championships - Men's Under-23 Road Race took place on October 11, 1997, in the Spanish city of San Sebastián. The race was won by Kurt Asle Arvesen of Norway.

Results
October 11, 1997: San Sebastian

References

Men's Under-23 Road Race
UCI Road World Championships – Men's under-23 road race